Gérard Darmon (born 29 February 1948) is a French-Moroccan actor and singer.

Personal life
He was the second husband of actress Mathilda May (mother of his two youngest children). He has three children: Virginie (born 1968) and, by May, daughter Sarah (born 17 August 1994) and son Jules (born 4 March 1997).

Darmon also did a cover of "Mambo Italiano".

Darmon is of Sephardic Jewish (Algerian-Jewish) descent. In July 2012, he was naturalized Moroccan by a decree from King Mohamed VI.

Theater

Filmography

Discography
 Au milieu de la nuit (2003)
 Dancing (2006)
 On s'aime (2008)

References

External links

 

1948 births
Male actors from Paris
20th-century French Sephardi Jews
Living people
Naturalized citizens of Morocco
Jewish French male actors
20th-century Moroccan male actors
21st-century Moroccan male actors
20th-century French male actors
21st-century French male actors